Itch mite may refer to:

Sarcoptes scabiei — scabies
Psorergates ovis — sheep itch mite
Psorobia bos — cattle itch mite
Pyemotes herfsi — oak leaf gall mite
Pyemotes tritici — straw itch mite
Pyemotes ventricosus — grain itch mite

Animal common name disambiguation pages